Les Arts Florissants is a Baroque musical ensemble in residence at the Théâtre de Caen in Caen, France. The organization was founded by conductor William Christie in 1979. The ensemble derives its name from the 1685 opera Les Arts florissants by Marc-Antoine Charpentier. The organization consists of a chamber orchestra of period instruments and a small vocal ensemble. Current notable members include soprano Danielle de Niese and tenor Paul Agnew, who has served as assistant conductor since 2007. Jonathan Cohen is also on the conducting staff; Christie remains the organization's Artistic Director.

Work

Although not specifically a Baroque opera ensemble, it is within this field that Les Arts Florissants has achieved its greatest successes. The majority of the ensemble's performances are of period operas (both staged and in concert), many of which are available on CD on the Harmonia Mundi and Erato labels and on DVD. The group first drew international acclaim in the area of opera in December 1986-January 1987 with a production of Jean-Baptiste Lully's Atys at the Opéra-Comique in Paris. The opera had not been performed since 1753 and Christie had unearthed the score at the Bibliothèque nationale de France and created a performing edition. William Christie: "There were a number of important moments in the history of the Arts Florissants, but there's one moment that obviously stands out – and that's the moment when we produced Atys." Christie had been approached by the director of the Paris Opera, Massimo Bogianckino, to think about putting on a Lully opera. Christie was advised by the Opéra-Comique's Thierry Fouquet that Quinault's libretto for Atys would demand an extraordinary stage director – Jean-Marie Villégier  took this role and he, together with Christie, created Atys. The production marked the renaissance of Baroque opera in France.

The ensemble has continued in a similar vein, by presenting the world premiere of Marc-Antoine Charpentier's opéra Médée in 1993 and many rarely heard works at their home in Caen and on the stages of major opera houses and concert venues like the Teatro Real, the Opéra national du Rhin, the Opéra National de Paris, Carnegie Hall, the Brooklyn Academy of Music, and the Barbican Centre. The ensemble also occasionally presents works from the standard repertoire, most particularly a number of operas by Wolfgang Amadeus Mozart.

Les Arts Florissants has also had a number of successes in the concert repertoire. The organization has performed and recorded a number of oratorios, cantatas, madrigals, masses, motets, and other musical forms typical of early music. Occasionally, the ensemble has made forays into contemporary repertoire, notably performing the world premiere of Betsy Jolas's Motets III - Hunc igitur terrorem at a gala on the occasion of the ensemble's 20th anniversary in 1999.

Many former members of Les Arts Florissants have gone on to have successful music careers outside of the organization. These include several internationally renowned conductors in the field of early music such as Marc Minkowski (founder of Les Musiciens du Louvre), Christophe Rousset (founder of Les Talens Lyriques), Hugo Reyne (founder of La Simphonie du Marais), and Hervé Niquet (founder of Le Concert Spirituel).

Partial list of productions

1982: Les arts florissants (Charpentier)
1983: Dido and Aeneas (Purcell)
1983: Il Ballo delle Ingrate (Monteverdi)
1985: Actéon (Charpentier)
1985: Anacréon (Rameau)
1985: La Passion selon Saint-Jean (Bach)
1986: Actéon  (Charpentier)
1986: Anacréon (Rameau)
1986: Atys (Lully)
1987: Atys (Lully)
1989: Atys (Lully)
1989: The Fairy Queen (Purcell)

1990: Les Indes galantes (Rameau)
1990: Le Malade imaginaire (Charpentier)
1990: Les Indes galantes (Rameau)
1991: Castor et Pollux (Rameau)
1992: Atys (Lully)
1993: Médée (Charpentier)
1993: Orlando (Handel)
1993: Les Indes galantes (Rameau)
1994: Médée (Charpentier)
1994: Die Zauberflöte (Mozart)
1994: Médée (Charpentier)
1995: Die Entführung aus dem Serail (Mozart)
1995: Die Zauberflöte (Mozart)
1995: King Arthur (Purcell)
1996: Acis and Galatea (Handel)
1996: Alcina (Handel)
1996: Hippolyte et Aricie (Rameau)
1996: Die Entführung aus dem Serail (Mozart)
1996: Semele (Handel)

1997: Hippolyte et Aricie (Rameau)
1997: Le Nozze di Figaro (Mozart)
1998: Les Pèlerins de la Mecque (Gluck)
1999: Les Indes galantes (Rameau)
1999: Alcina (Handel)
2000: Il ritorno d'Ulisse in patria (Monteverdi)
2000: Les Indes galantes (Rameau)
2001: Il Tito (Cesti)
2002: Il ritorno d'Ulisse in patria (Monteverdi)
2002: L'incoronazione di Poppea (Monteverdi)
2003: Les Boréades (Rameau)
2003: Les Indes galantes (Rameau)
2003: Serse (Handel)
2004: Les Paladins (Rameau)
2004: Hercules (Handel)
2006: Hercules (Handel)
2006: Die Zauberflöte (Mozart)
2006: Die Entführung aus dem Serail (Mozart)
2008: Armide (Lully)
2010: The Fairy Queen (Purcell)
2012 David et Jonathas (Charpentier) Festival d'Aix en Provence
2015: Un Jardin à l'ItalienneDiscographyCaecelia, virgo et martyr  H.413, Filius prodigus H.399, Magnificat à 3 voix H.73, Marc-Antoine Charpentier, Harmonia Mundi, 1979Cantique de Moÿse ; Veni sponsa mea ; Trois fantaisies à quatre pour les violes ; Espoir de toute âme affligée ; O bone Jesu, Étienne Moulinié, Harmonia Mundi, 1980Madrigaux des VIIe et VIIIe livres, Claudio Monteverdi, Harmonia Mundi, 1981Pastorale sur la naissance de N.S. Jesus-Christ, H.483 ; In nativitatem Domini Nostri Jesu Christi canticum H.414 ; Magnificat à 3 voix, H.73, Marc-Antoine Charpentier, Harmonia Mundi 1982Actéon H.481, Intermèdes pour Le mariage forcé H.494 ii, Marc-Antoine Charpentier, Harmonia Mundi 1982Les Antiennes "O" de l'Avent H.36 - H.43, Marc-Antoine Charpentier, LP Harmonia Mundi, 1982. Grand prix du disque académie Charles Cros.
 Anacréon ballet en un acte, Jean-Philippe Rameau, Harmonia Mundi, 1982Les Arts florissants H.487, Ouverture de la Comtesse d'Escarbagnas H.494 i & Intermèdes nouveaux du Mariage forcé H.494 ii, Marc-Antoine Charpentier Harmonia Mundi, 1982Un Oratorio de Noël ; In nativitatem Domini canticum, H.416 ; Sur la naissance de Notre Seigneur Jésus Christ H.482 de Marc Antoine Charpentier, Harmonia Mundi, 1983Ballo delle ingrate : livre VIII des madrigaux ; Sestina, Claudio Monteverdi, Harmonia Mundi, 1983Médée H.491, tragédie lyrique en un prologue et cinq actes, Marc-Antoine Charpentier, Harmonia Mundi, 1984 - 2019 
Grand Prix du Disque Académie Charles Cros, La Référence Compcact magazine, Sélection Télérama ffff, Diapason d'or, Le Timbre d'Argent de la revue Opéra, Diamant de Harmonie panorama musique, Gramophone award 1985, International Record Critics Award Montreux 1985, Prix Opus 1985 USA, Choc de Classica 2019Le Reniement de Saint Pierre H.424 ; Méditations pour la Carême H.380 - H.389, Marc-Antoine Charpentier, Harmonia Mundi, 1985Missa Assumpta est Maria H.11, Domine salvum H.303, Litanies de la Vierge H.83, Te deum H.146, Marc-Antoine Charpentier, Harmonia Mundi 1988Madrigal classique, madrigal soliste, comédie madrigalesque. L’âge d’or du madrigal, Arles, Harmonia Mundi, 1998Madrigaux à 5 voix, Carlo Gesualdo, prince de Venosa, Arles, Harmonia Mundi, 1988
The Fairy-Queen, Henry Purcell, Arles, Harmonia Mundi, 1989Oratorio per la Settimana Santa ; Un peccator pentito, Luigi Rossi, Arles, Harmonia Mundi, 1989Les antiennes "O" de l'Avent : H.36 à H.43 ; Noël sur les instruments : H.534 ; In Nativitatem D.N.J.C. canticum : H.414, Marc-Antoine Charpentier, Arles, CD Harmonia Mundi, 1990Le Malade imaginaire H.495, Marc-Antoine Charpentier, Harmonia Mundi, 1990Cantates, Louis-Nicolas Clérambault, Harmonia Mundi, 1990Te Deum ; Super flumina Babilonis ; Confitebor tibi Domine, Michel-Richard Delalande, Harmonia Mundi, 1991Les vingt figures réthoriques [sic] d'une passion XXe festival de Saintes, Francesco Cavalli, Luigi Rossi, et al. [S.l.], K. 617, 1991Orfeo, Luigi Rossi, Arles, Harmonia Mundi, 1991Pièces de clavecin (1724) Les Indes galantes: suite d'orchestre ; Anacréon : ballet en un acte, scène 5 ; In convertendo, grand motet, Jean-Philippe Rameau, Arles, Harmonia Mundi, 1992Pygmalion ; Nélée et Myrthis, Jean-Philippe Rameau, Arles, Harmonia Mundi, 1992Rameau, Jean-Philippe Rameau, Arles, Harmonia Mundi Plus, 1992Motets & Madrigaux Il ballo delle ingrate ; Selva morale ; L'incoronazione di Poppea, Claudio Monteverdi, Arles, Harmonia Mundi, 1992Airs de cour (1689), Michel Lambert, Harmonia Mundi, 1992Idoménée, André Campra, Arles, Harmonia Mundi, 1992Atys, tragédie lyrique en un prologue et cinq actes ; Dies Irae ; Petits motets ; Airs pour le clavecin, Jean Baptiste Lully, Harmonia Mundi, 1993Lully, Jean Baptiste Lully, Arles, France : Harmonia Mundi, 1993Te Deum ; motets, Guillaume Bouzignac, Arles, Harmonia Mundi, 1993
King Arthur, Henry Purcell, [S.l.n.d.], 1995Baroque festival vol. 1.Firenze, CD Classica, 1993Médée H.491, tragédie lyrique en un prologue et cinq actes, Marc-Antoine Charpentier. Erato 1994 
10 de Répertoire, Choc du Monde de la Musique, Diapason d'or, Diamant Opéra magazine.A Purcell companion, Henry Purcell, Arles, Harmonia Mundi, 1994Messiah, George Frideric Handel, Arles, Harmonia Mundi, 1994Dido & Æneas, Henry Purcell, Arles, Harmonia Mundi, 1994Concerti grossi op. 6, George Frideric Handel, Arles, Harmonia Mundi, 1995Requiem : KV. 626, Ave verum corpus : KV 618, Introitus, Kyrie, Dies irae (excerpts), Wolfgang Amadeus Mozart, Paris, Erato, 1995Jefferson in Paris, Richard Robbins, New York, Angel, 1995La Descente d’Orphée aux Enfers H.488, Marc-Antoine Charpentier, Erato, 1995Les Plaisirs de Versailles H.480, Airs sur les Stances du Cid  H.457 - H.458 - H.459, Amor vince ogni cosa H.492, Erato 1996Il Sant'Alessio, Stefano Landi, Paris, Erato, 1996De Lully à Rameau, Jean Baptiste Lully, et al. Harmonia Mundi, 1996Il Ballo delle ingrate Sestina, Claudio Monteverdi, Harmonia Mundi, 1996Die Zauberflöte KV 620, Wolfgang Amadeus Mozart, Erato, 1996Hippolyte et Aricie, Jean-Philippe Rameau, Erato, 1997Il Combattimento di Tancredi e Clorinda, Claudio Monteverdi, Harmonia Mundi, 1997
Leçons de ténèbres, François Couperin, Erato, 1997Petits motets, Michel-Richard Delalande, Harmonia Mundi, 1997Le Grand Siècle français musique au temps de Louis XIV de Kenneth Gilbert, Arles, Harmonia Mundi, 1997Les Fêtes d’Hébé, Jean-Philippe Rameau, [S.l.s.n.], 1997Divertissements, airs et concerts, Il faut rire et chanter, dispute de bergers H.424, La Pierre philosophale H.501, + (H.469, H.467, H.442, H.449 b, H.462, H.452, H.443, H.441, H.455, H.467, H.446, H.447, H.454, H.461, H.545) de Marc-Antoine Charpentier, Paris, Erato, 1998David et Jonathas H.490, tragédie lyrique en cinq actes, Marc-Antoine Charpentier, Arles, Harmonia Mundi, 1998Voyage en Italie : deux siècles de musique à Rome, Venise, Ferrare, 1550-1750, Arles, Harmonia Mundi, 1998La musique sacrée à travers les âges, Marc-Antoine Charpentier et al., [S.l.], Harmonia Mundi, 1998Musique de ballet 1979-1999 : 20e anniversaire Les Arts Florissants, Jean-Philippe Rameau, Marc-Antoine Charpentier, Paris, Erato, 1999Entfuhrung aus dem Serail, Schäfer, Petibon, Christie, Wolfgang Amadeus Mozart, [S.l.n.d], 1999Soleil, musiques au siècle de Louis XIV, Paris, Erato, 1999Die Entführung aus dem Serail, Wolfgang Amadeus Mozart, Paris, Erato, 1999
Great Mass in C minor K.427, Wolfgang Amadeus Mozart, Paris, Erato, 1999Acis and Galatea, George Frideric Handel, Paris, Erato, 1999Castor et Pollux : chœurs et danses, Jean-Philippe Rameau, Arles, Harmonia Mundi, 1999Cantates françaises, André Campra, Arles, Harmonia Mundi, 2000Messe de minuit H.9, In nativitatem Domini canticum H.416, Noël sur les instruments H.531 N° 2, H.534 N° 3,4,6. Marc-Antoine Charpentier, Erato 2000Grands Motets lorrains pour Louis XIV, Henry Desmarest, Paris, Erato, 2000Alcina, George Frideric Handel, Paris, Erato, 2000Zoroastre, Jean-Philippe Rameau, Paris, Erato, 2002Jephté, Michel Pignolet de Montéclair, Arles, Harmonia Mundi, 2002Les divertissements de Versailles, Jean-Baptiste Lully, Erato, 2002
Theodora, George Frideric Handel, Paris, Erato, 2003Grands Motets, André Campra, Virgin Classics, 2003Selva morale e spirituale , Claudio Monteverdi, Arles, Harmonia Mundi, 2003Violin Sonatas, George Frideric Handel, Virgin Classics, 2003Il Ritorno d'Ulisse in patria, Claudio Monteverdi, [S.l.], Virgin Classics, 2003Marc-Antoine Charpentier, Marc-Antoine Charpentier, Arles, Harmonia Mundi, 2004Serse, George Frideric Handel, Virgin Classics, 2004Les Boréades, Jean-Philippe Rameau, Waldron, Opus Arte, 2004
 Le Coffret du Tricentenaire , Marc-Antoine Charpentier, Harmonia Mundi, 2004Louis XIV Musique à Versailles au temps du Roi Soleil, [S.l.], Harmonia Mundi, 2004Grand Office des Morts  H.2, H.12, H.311,Te Deum H.146, Marc-Antoine Charpentier, Virgin Classics, 2005Salve Regina - Petits Motets, Andre Campra, Francois Couperin, Virgin Classics, 2005Les Indes galantes, Jean-Philippe Rameau, Waldron, Opus Arte, 2005Chansons de la Renaissance, Harmonia Mundi, 2005Judicium Salomonis H.422- (Solomon's judgement), Motet pour une longue Offrande H.434, Marc-Antoine Charpentier, Virgin Classics, 2006Handel Arias, George Frideric Handel, Decca, 2007Le Jardin des Voix, Virgin Classics, 2006
 Le Jardin des voix, William Christie, [S.l.], Virgin Classics, 2006Opera's first master The musical dramas of Claudio Monteverdi, Claudio Monteverdi, Pompton Plains, Amadeus Press, 2006Un oratorio de Noël In Nativitatem Domini Canticum H.416, Les Antiennes "O" de l'avent H.36 à H.43, Noëls pour les instruments H.534, Sur la Naissance de Notre Seigneur Jésus Christ'' H.482 de Marc-Antoine Charpentier, Arles, Harmonia Mundi (1982 - 1983)  2021

Sources

References

External links
Official website
Official resources website of Les Arts Florissants, with free scores, audio and video files, texts, photos...

Mixed early music groups
Musical groups established in 1979
French opera companies
Musical groups from Normandy
1979 establishments in France
Erato Records artists
Articles containing video clips